Vincent Sierro (born 8 October 1995) is a Swiss professional footballer who plays as a midfielder for  club Toulouse.

Career
In July 2018, Sierro returned to Switzerland joining St. Gallen on loan for the 2018–19 season.

In June 2019, Sierro signed a four-year contract with Young Boys.

In January 2023, Sierro signed for Ligue 1 club Toulouse.

Career statistics

Honours 
Young Boys
 Swiss Super League: 2019–20
 Swiss Cup: 2019–20

References

1995 births
Living people
People from Sion, Switzerland
Swiss men's footballers
Association football midfielders
FC Sion players
SC Freiburg players
SC Freiburg II players
FC St. Gallen players
BSC Young Boys players
Toulouse FC players
Swiss Super League players
Bundesliga players
Regionalliga players
Ligue 1 players
Swiss expatriate footballers
Swiss expatriate sportspeople in Germany
Swiss expatriate sportspeople in France
Expatriate footballers in Germany
Expatriate footballers in France
Sportspeople from Valais